Burr Oak is a city in Jewell County, Kansas, United States.  As of the 2020 census, the population of the city was 140.

History
Burr Oak was laid out in 1871, and it was incorporated as a city in 1880. It was named from the Burr Oak Creek.

The first post office in Burr Oak was established in June 1871.

Geography
Burr Oak is located at  (39.868516, -98.304297).

Climate

Demographics

2010 census
As of the census of 2010, there were 174 people, 93 households, and 50 families living in the city. The racial makeup of the city was 98.3% White, 0.6% Native American, and 1.1% from two or more races. Hispanic or Latino of any race were 1.7% of the population.

There were 93 households, of which 18.3% had children under the age of 18 living with them, 38.7% were married couples living together, 10.8% had a female householder with no husband present, 4.3% had a male householder with no wife present, and 46.2% were non-families. 44.1% of all households were made up of individuals, and 30.1% had someone living alone who was 65 years of age or older. The average household size was 1.87 and the average family size was 2.52.

The median age in the city was 55 years. 13.8% of residents were under the age of 18; 4.5% were between the ages of 18 and 24; 14.3% were from 25 to 44; 39.7% were from 45 to 64; and 27.6% were 65 years of age or older. The gender makeup of the city was 47.7% male and 52.3% female.

2000 census
As of the census of 2000, there were 265 people, 128 households, and 72 families living in the city. The racial makeup of the city was 96.98% White, 1.89% Native American, and 1.13% from two or more races. Hispanic or Latino of any race were 1.51% of the population.

There were 128 households, out of which 20.3% had children under the age of 18 living with them, 46.9% were married couples living together, 7.0% had a female householder with no husband present, and 43.0% were non-families. 39.1% of all households were made up of individuals, and 24.2% had someone living alone who was 65 years of age or older. The average household size was 2.07 and the average family size was 2.78.

In the city, the population was spread out, with 22.3% under the age of 18, 5.3% from 18 to 24, 20.8% from 25 to 44, 27.2% from 45 to 64, and 24.5% who were 65 years of age or older. The median age was 46 years. For every 100 females, there were 80.3 males. For every 100 females age 18 and over, there were 77.6 males.

The median income for a household in the city was $18,750, and the median income for a family was $30,357. Males had a median income of $21,111 versus $16,250 for females. The per capita income for the city was $10,726. About 19.1% of families and 21.8% of the population were below the poverty line, including 20.0% of those under the age of eighteen and 14.8% of those 65 or over.

Education
The community is served by Rock Hills USD 107 public school district.  Burr Oak became a part of Rock Hills USD 107 located in Mankato in 2006. The Rock Hills High School mascot is Grizzlies.

School unification consolidated Burr Oak and Esbon schools forming White Rock schools in 1983. The White Rock elementary school and high school were located in Burr Oak. White Rock High School's mascot was Eagles. The Jewell-White Rock team was the Predators.

The Burr Oak High School mascot was Braves.

References

Further reading

External links

 Burr Oak - Directory of Public Officials
 Burr Oak city map, KDOT

Cities in Kansas
Cities in Jewell County, Kansas